The Château de Mareuil is a château in Mareuil-sur-Ay, Marne, France.

Gallery

Châteaux in Marne (department)